Stanislav Georgiyevich Yeryomin (born February 26, 1951 in Sverdlovsk, Soviet Union), last name also spelled Eremin and Yeremin, is a prominent retired Russian professional basketball player and coach. During his playing career, at a height of 1.81 m (5'11 ") tall, he played at the point guard position. He is also a retired Russian Army Colonel.

Club playing career
Yeryomin spent most of his career with CSKA Moscow. He was a member of the FIBA European Selection, in 1979 and 1981.

National team playing career
Yeryomin was a member of the senior Soviet Union national basketball team that won the bronze medal at the 1980 Moscow Summer Olympic Games.

Coaching career
Yeryomin was a 4 time Russian Men's Coach of the Year (2004, 2005, 2006, 2007).

Awards and accomplishments

Club playing career
9× USSR League Champion: (1976, 1977, 1978, 1979, 1980, 1981, 1982, 1983, 1984)
2× FIBA European Selection: (1979, 1981)
USSR Cup Winner: (1982)

Club coaching career
9× Russian Championship Champion: (1992, 1993, 1994, 1995, 1996, 1997, 1998, 1999, 2000)
1996 EuroLeague Final Four: (3rd place)
2× North European League Champion: (2000, 2003)
Russian Cup Winner: (2003)
FIBA Europe League (FIBA EuroChallenge) Champion: (2004)
4× Russian Men's Coach of the Year: (2004, 2005, 2006, 2007)

References

External links
FIBA Profile

1951 births
Living people
Basketball players at the 1980 Summer Olympics
BC Krasnye Krylia coaches
BC UNICS coaches
BC Ural Yekaterinburg players
BC Zenit Saint Petersburg coaches
FIBA EuroBasket-winning players
FIBA World Championship-winning players
Honoured Coaches of Russia
Medalists at the 1980 Summer Olympics
Olympic basketball players of the Soviet Union
Olympic bronze medalists for the Soviet Union
Olympic medalists in basketball
PBC CSKA Moscow coaches
PBC CSKA Moscow players
Point guards
Russian basketball coaches
Soviet basketball coaches
Soviet men's basketball players
1982 FIBA World Championship players
Soviet expatriate sportspeople in Syria